Emine Semiye Önasya (28 March 1864 – 1944), mostly known as Emine Semiye and Emine Vahide, was a Turkish writer, activist, and early feminist.

Early life and education
Emine Semiye was born in Istanbul on 28 March 1866. She was the second daughter of Ahmed Cevdet Pasha and sister of Fatma Aliye. Her mother was Adviye Rabia Hanım. Emine Semiye studied psychology and sociology in France and Switzerland for seven years. She was one of the first Ottoman Muslim women educated in Europe.

Career
From 1882 Emine Semiye worked as a Turkish and literature teacher in Istanbul and in other provinces. She served as an inspector at girls’ schools and an assistant nurse at Şişli Etfal Hospital. Her writings on politics and education were published in various publications, including Mütalaa (in Thessalonica) and Hanımlara Mahsus Gazete (Ottoman Turkish: Newspaper for Women) after the declaration of the constitutional monarchy in 1908. She also wrote a math textbook entitled Hulasa-i Ilm-i Hesap in 1893. In Hanımlara Mahsus Gazete she used first several pseudonyms, but later used her name and published various stories and travel writings. Her most-known novels are Sefalet (1908) (Poverty) and Gayya Kuyusu (The Pit of Hell).

Emine Semiye, together with her older sister Fatma Aliye, was a significant figure for the Ottoman women movement. Emine Semiye was much more progressive and less orthodox than her sister.
She established several charity organizations to help women. One of them was Şefkât-i Nisvân (Women’s Compassion) which was established in Thessalonica in 1898. Another charity founded by her was Hizmet-i Nisvân Cemiyeti (Service of Women Association).

She became a member of the progressive Committee of Union and Progress and later, of the Ottoman Democratic Party. In late 1890s Emine Semiye was the head of the Union and Progress Women’s Revolution Committee in Thessalonica. In 1920, she was named a member of the governing board of the Turkish Journalists' Association which had been called the Ottoman Press Association until that year.

Personal life and death
Emine Semiye lived for a long time in Paris. She married twice. Her first husband was Mustafa Bey. The second was Reşit Pasha. They divorced later. She had two sons; one from each husband. Their names were Hasan Riza, son of Mustafa Bey and Cevdet Lagaş, son to Reşit Pasha. She died in Istanbul in 1944.

References

20th-century Turkish women politicians
20th-century Turkish women writers
1864 births
1944 deaths
Novelists from the Ottoman Empire
Writers from Istanbul
Turkish feminist writers
Turkish women novelists
Committee of Union and Progress politicians